("African Notebook") is a 2016 documentary film by Heidi Specogna, a Swiss filmmaker. Beginning in 2008, Specogna's long-term observation follows the lives of two young Central African woman, Amzine and Arlette. The film was prompted by the discovery of a small exercise book, full of courageous testimonies by more than 300 victims of war crimes committed by Central African mercenaries during armed conflict between October 2002 and March 2003.

Content
As a result of rape, Amzine, a young Muslim woman, gave birth to a child. Looking at her now 12-year-old daughter Fane is a daily reminder of the suffering she entrusted to this book.

Arlette, a Christian girl, has agonised for years due to a gunshot to the knee that did not want to heal. After a successful surgery in Berlin, she holds on to hope for a pain-free existence.

But while the two young woman try to master their difficult daily lives with confidence – and while, in The Hague, the legal prosecution of crimes committed during the last war is still in progress – the next war breaks out in the Central African Republic. Amzine, Fane''' and Arlette'' must once again face a maelstrom of violence, death and expulsion. At their side, the film bears witness to the collapse of order and civilization in a country torn apart by civil war and coup d’états.

Reception

Giorgia Del Don writes for Cineurope: "Heidi Specogna’s latest film literally speaks through images [..] about a sad and hopeless beauty. Without ever toppling over into pity, the director portrays the everyday reality of her protagonists with dashes of hope." She particularly praises the intensity of the film: "Heidi Specogna [...] make[s] us understand to what extent life has the same value everywhere. A terrible and poetic film it takes extreme courage to watch."

Awards
 won the Zonta Club Award at Locarno International Film Festival 2016.

At DOK Leipzig 2016,  was awarded the Silver Dove.

 received the 2016 German Human Rights Film Award (Deutscher Menschenrechts-Filmpreis)

References

External links

 
  at Rushlake Media
 Cahier Africain at Filmbringer Distribution
 Part 1 and Part 2 on YouTube distributed by Deutsche Welle

2016 films
2016 documentary films
Swiss documentary films
German documentary films
Films about war crimes
Documentary films about war crimes
Documentary films about Africa
2010s English-language films
2010s German films